Cyana mira is a moth of the family Erebidae. It was described by Röber in 1925. It is found in New Guinea.

References

Cyana
Moths described in 1925